Hiidenvesi (literally meaning the "water of goblin") is the second largest lake in the Uusimaa region in Finland. The biggest part of the lake is located in the municipality of Vihti and smaller parts in the town of Lohja. The lake drains through the Väänteenjoki River into lake Lohjanjärvi. Both lakes are part of the Karjaanjoki basin that drains into the Gulf of Finland.

See also
List of lakes in Finland

References

External links
 

Karjaanjoki basin
Lakes of Lohja
Lakes of Vihti